Tolliella truncatula is a moth of the family Cosmopterigidae. It is found in Henan, China.

The wingspan is about 18 mm. The forewings are ochreous brown except a small area of white at the base. The costal margin has a large white spot before the apex. The hindwings are blackish brown.

Etymology
The specific name is derived from Latin truncatulus and refers to the valva which truncates terminally.

References

Moths described in 2009
Cosmopteriginae